Fencott and Murcott is a civil parish about  south of Bicester in the Cherwell district of Oxfordshire, England. The parish is bounded on the north and west by the River Ray and has an area of just over  being  inclusive of roads and watercourses. It includes the villages of Fencott and Murcott and had a population of about 285 residents in 2011. There are no shops or post offices but there is one public house, the Nut Tree Inn at Murcott. The M40 motorway passes through the northern part of the parish. The parish covers most of Otmoor, including the Otmoor RSPB nature reserve.

References

External links

 Fencott and Murcott page on the Alice's Meadow website.
 Fencott & Murcott Parish Council page on Oxfordshire County Council website.
 Fencott & Murcott page on the Otmoor Notice Board website.
 Fencott & Murcott page on the OWLS website provided by Oxfordshire County Council. This shows the different landscape types and Site of Special Scientific Interest (SSI's) in the parish.

Civil parishes in Oxfordshire
Otmoor